"Tomorrow Never Comes" is a 1945 song by Ernest Tubb, composed by Tubb with lyrics by Johnny Bond. The song was recorded at least three times by Glen Campbell.

Cover versions 

 B. J. Thomas in 1965 (US No. 80 & Canada No. 89)
 Glen Campbell in 1965
 Brian Poole in 1967
 Slim Whitman in 1970
 Elvis Presley in 1970
 Jim Nabors in 1970
 George Jones in 1974
 Charles Mann

Other albums and compilations 
The Ernest Tubb Story by Ernest Tubb in 1959
The Definitive Collection
Too Late to Worry – Too Blue to Cry by Glen Campbell in 1963
By the Time I Get to Phoenix by Glen Campbell in 1967
Gentle on My Mind by Glen Campbell in 1972
Classic Campbell via EMI in 2006
The Essential Glen Campbell Volume Three
The Legacy (1961–2002) by Glen Campbell in 2003
Glen Campbell Collection
Limited Collector's Edition
A Picture of Me (Without You) by George Jones in 1972
Country and West by Dottie West in 1970
Country Roads by the Osborne Brothers in 1971
Elvis Country (I'm 10,000 Years Old) by Elvis Presley 
Walk a Mile in My Shoes: The Essential '70s Masters by Elvis Presley 
The World of Lynn Anderson by Lynn Anderson in 1971.
Don't Come Home a Drinkin' (With Lovin' on Your Mind) by Loretta Lynn in 1967
Marco T. Una Sesion Country by Marco T. in 2001

See also 
Ernest Tubb discography

References 

1945 songs
Ernest Tubb songs
Songs written by Ernest Tubb